Aelle, also seen as Ælle, Aella, or Ælla may refer to:

Ælle of Sussex, king of Sussex (r. 477–514)
Ælla of Deira (died 588), king of Deira
Ælla of Northumbria (died 867), king of Northumbria (r. 860s)
Aella (Amazon), an Amazon in Greek mythology

Old English given names